"Megalomaniac" is a song by the American rock band Incubus, from their 2004 album A Crow Left of the Murder... It was released as a single in December 2003, and eventually reached the top of Billboards Modern Rock Tracks, where it stayed for a six-week period. Outside the United States, the song reached the top 30 in Italy, New Zealand, and the United Kingdom.

Composition
The song begins with a cyclic, scratchy warble that lasts about 30 seconds (not present in the radio edit) before fading into a more conventional introduction.  The entire buildup lasts about one minute in all before climaxing into a heavy rock riff, with distorted electric guitars and bass, before going into the first verse.  The song alternates between more mellow mood of the verses and the driving rock feel of the chorus, also managing to incorporate a bridge in the key of Dm, in contrast to the rest of the song, which is in Gm.

Lyrical interpretation
Lead singer Brandon Boyd says the song is not specifically targeting anybody - the song's meaning pertains to megalomaniacs in general with a particular emphasis on El Guapo from the American comedy film Three Amigos.

Music video
The video shows images of Adolf Hitler interspersed with shots of the band and of many people who are protesting. As the video progresses, officers are sent to disperse the crowd. The speaker's podium rises very high - then it is revealed that the podium is actually a gas pump. The gas pump spurts oil over the crowd, while the main figure's head is consumed by a bald eagle and starts eating people that turned into fish.

Track listing
US/EU CD single
 "Megalomaniac" (Radio Edit)
 "Monuments and Melodies"
 "Pistola" (Live at Lollapalooza 2003)

Charts

References

External links
 Billboard.com Artist Chart History
 Amazon.com

2003 singles
Incubus (band) songs
Music videos directed by Floria Sigismondi
Song recordings produced by Brendan O'Brien (record producer)
2003 songs
Epic Records singles
Immortal Records singles
Songs written by Brandon Boyd
Songs written by Mike Einziger
Songs written by Ben Kenney
Songs written by Chris Kilmore
Songs written by José Pasillas
Songs about nuclear war and weapons